Aphanus is a genus of dirt-colored seed bugs in the family Rhyparochromidae. There are more than 20 described species in Aphanus.

Species
These 21 species belong to the genus Aphanus:

 Aphanus carpenteri (Slater, 1964)
 Aphanus oculatus (Germar, 1837)
 Aphanus rolandri Linnaeus, 1758
 Aphanus zucholdi (Giebel *, 1856)
 † Aphanus antiquus (Heyden, 1859)
 † Aphanus boyeri (Hope *, 1847)
 † Aphanus coloratus (Germar & Berendt, 1856)
 † Aphanus contractus Theobald, 1937
 † Aphanus cruciatus (Heer *, 1861)
 † Aphanus detectus (Forster *, 1891)
 † Aphanus dilatatus Theobald, 1937
 † Aphanus dryadum (Heer, 1853)
 † Aphanus grassei (Piton & Theobald, 1935)
 † Aphanus heeri (Giebel *, 1856)
 † Aphanus morio (Heer, 1853)
 † Aphanus nigropedis (Jordan, 1967)
 † Aphanus oblongus (Heer, 1853)
 † Aphanus obsoletus (Heer, 1853)
 † Aphanus petrensis (Scudder, 1890)
 † Aphanus pulchellus (Heer, 1853)
 † Aphanus senius (Germar & Berendt, 1856)

References

External links

 

Rhyparochromidae